Marcus E. Richmond (born May 4, 1956) is an American politician serving as a member of the Arkansas House of Representatives for the 21st district. Elected in November 2014, he assumed office on January 12, 2015.

Early life and education 
Richmond was born in Mena, Arkansas. He earned a Bachelor of Science degree in health and physical education from Arkansas Tech University.

Career 
Richmond served in the United States Marine Corps from 1978 to 1998, retiring with the rank of lieutenant colonel. From 1998 to 2000, he worked as a football coach at the Hargrave Military Academy. Richmond was the president and CEO of America's Pet Registry and operated a ranch with his brother. Richmond was elected to the Arkansas House of Representatives in November 2014 and assumed office on January 12, 2015. During the 2017 legislative session, he served as vice chair of the House Public Transportation.

References 

Living people
Republican Party members of the Arkansas House of Representatives
People from Mena, Arkansas
Arkansas Tech University alumni
1956 births